Greg Weight (born 2 December 1946 in Sydney, Australia) is an Australian photographer specialising in fine art photography and portraiture. Greg was the inaugural winner of the Australian Photographic Portrait Prize in 2003 and his book Australian Artists, portraits by Greg Weight was published by Chapter and Verse in 2004. He was a member of the Yellow House artist's collective in the early 1970s.

Margaret Olley

References

External links 
Greg Weight Photography
Australian Galleries Profile of Greg Weight.

Australian portrait photographers
20th-century Australian photographers
Living people
1946 births
21st-century Australian photographers